Lynn Meskell (born 1967) is an archaeologist and anthropologist who currently works as a Professor at the University of Pennsylvania.

She has worked as the 26th Penn Integrates Knowledge Program (PIK) Professor since her appointment in 2020, which is a program appointed to faculty with multidisciplinary research and teaching and who are working in at least two Penn Schools.

Meskell is also the Richard D. Green Professor of Anthropology in the School of Arts and Sciences, Graduate Professor of Historic Preservation in the Weitzman School of Design, and a curator for the Penn Museum's Middle East and Asia areas.

Since 2019 and until 2025 at Cornell University, she has been an Andrew D. White Professor-at-Large.

She is originally from Australia.

Education 
Meskell received her B.A. from the University of Sydney in 1994 (First Class) and University Medal. She was awarded the King's College scholarship from the University of Cambridge for her Ph.D. in Archaeology (1994-1997). In her doctoral dissertation, Meskell analyzed data from the settlement and cemeteries of Deir el-Medina, a New Kingdom worker’s village across the Nile from Luxor.

Early career 
From 1997-1999 she held the Salvesen Junior Research Fellowship at New College, University of Oxford before accepting a position in the Anthropology Department at Columbia University in New York City where she became Professor in 2005.

Meskell founded the Journal of Social Archaeology, releasing its first publication in June 2001.

In 2002, she was a National Endowment for the Humanities Fellow at the School for Advanced Research in Santa Fe. Meskell received the Andrew W. Mellon Foundation's New Directions Fellowship in 2004, supporting training in ethnography and African studies to prepare her for work in South Africa. She carried out fieldwork in the Kruger National Park and Mapungubwe National Park.

Career and research 
Meskell’s interests include socio-politics, archaeological ethics, global heritage, materiality, as well as feminist and postcolonial theory. She is recognized for her contributions to feminist archaeology, archaeological ethics, and issues of heritage. Her earlier research examined social life in New Kingdom Egypt, natural and cultural heritage in South Africa, and the archaeology of figurines and burial at the Neolithic site of Çatalhöyük, Turkey.

Meskell conducted an institutional ethnography of UNESCO World Heritage, 
criticizing the World Heritage Program through her research. She traced the politics of governance and sovereignty and the subsequent implications for multilateral diplomacy, international conservation, and heritage rights. Employing archival and ethnographic analysis, she has revealed UNESCO’s early forays into a one-world archaeology and its later commitments to global heritage.

In other fieldwork across India she explores monumental regimes of research and preservation around World Heritage sites and how diverse actors and agencies address the needs of living communities. In 2016 she was invited to India through the Global Initiative of Academic Networks (GIAN) program.

From 2019-2020, she was the Shirley and Leonard Ely Professor of Humanities and Sciences in the Department of Anthropology at Stanford University.Since 2020, Meskell has been a Professor in the College of Arts and Sciences and the Weitzman School of Design, and a Penn Museum curator for the Middle East and Asia.

Awards and honors 
Meskell is an Honorary Professor in the School of Geography, Archaeology and Environmental Studies at the University of the Witwatersrand, South Africa and in the Center for Archaeology, Heritage & Museum Studies, Shiv Nadar University, India.

She has been awarded grants and fellowships for over 20 years from various institutions, including those from the Andrew W. Mellon Foundation, the National Science Foundation, the Australian Research Council, the American Academy in Rome, the School of American Research, Oxford University and Cambridge University.

In 2017, Meskell was elected Fellow of the Australian Academy of the Humanities. That same year, she received an Honorary Doctorate from the American University of Rome, Italy.

Books 
 2018 A Future in Ruins: UNESCO, World Heritage and the Dream of Peace, Oxford University Press: New York.
 2015 Global Heritage: A Reader, (editor) Blackwell: Oxford.
 2012 The Nature of Heritage: The New South Africa, Blackwell: Oxford.
 2009 Cosmopolitan Archaeologies, (editor) Duke University Press: Durham.
 2005 Archaeologies of Materiality, (editor) Blackwell: Oxford.
 2005 Embedding Ethics, (edited with Peter Pels) Berg: Oxford.
 2004 Object Worlds in Ancient Egypt: Material Biographies Past and Present, Berg: Oxford.
 2004 Companion to Social Archaeology, (edited with Robert Preucel) Blackwell: Oxford.
 2003 Embodied Lives: Figuring Ancient Maya and Egyptian Experience, (authored with Rosemary Joyce) Routledge: London.
 2002 Private Life in New Kingdom Egypt, Princeton University Press: Princeton.
 1999 Archaeologies of Social Life: Age, Sex, Class Etcetera in Ancient Egypt, Social Archaeology Series. Blackwell: Oxford.
 1998 Archaeology under Fire: Nationalism, Politics and Heritage in the Eastern Mediterranean and Middle East, (editor) Routledge: London.

References 

Stanford University faculty
Australian archaeologists
1967 births
Living people
Australian women archaeologists
Alumni of the University of Cambridge
University of Sydney alumni
Columbia University faculty
Fellows of the Australian Academy of the Humanities